Sher Dil  is a  1990 Indian Hindi-language film directed by Mohan Segal, starring Dharmendra, Rishi Kapoor, Anita Raj, Kimi Katkar, Rohini Hattangadi, Prema Narayan, Pradeep Kumar, Gulshan Grover and Kader Khan. The actor Kader Khan played a double role of Shobraj / Lobhraj.

Cast
 Dharmendra as Prakash Saxena / Prof. Avinash Saxena / Shera
 Rishi Kapoor as Sanjay Saxena
 Pradeep Kumar as Ram Kumar Saxena
 Rohini Hattangadi as Maya Devi Saxena
 Anita Raj as Kiran Kailashnath
 Kimi Katkar as Jyoti Kailashnath
 Kader Khan as Charles Shobhraj / Lobhraj (Double Role)
 Gulshan Grover as Ranjeet Shobhraj
 Shiva Rindani as Ranjeet's Sidekick
 Prema Narayan as Julie
 Piloo J. Wadia as College Interviewer
 Praveen Kumar as Goon at Club
 Arjun  as Rapist who molest Jyoti

Soundtrack

References

External links
 

1990 films
1990s Hindi-language films
Films scored by Laxmikant–Pyarelal